John Forster, 1st Baron Forster of Harraby  (15 September 1888 – 24 July 1972), known as Sir John Forster between 1939 and 1959, was a British barrister and public servant.

Knighted at St James's Palace 13 July 1939 Forster was appointed President of the Industrial Court in 1946. The following year he was made a Knight Commander of the Order of the British Empire (KBE). In 1959 he was raised to the peerage as Baron Forster of Harraby, of Beckenham in the County of Kent.

Lord Forster of Harraby died in July 1972, aged 83, when the barony became extinct.

Arms

References

External links

1888 births
1972 deaths
British King's Counsel
Knights Commander of the Order of the British Empire
Hereditary barons created by Elizabeth II